("O Lord, save thy people"), WAB 40, is a motet composed by Anton Bruckner in 1884.

History 
The motet, based on a few verses of the Te Deum, was composed on 14 November 1884, presumably on request of Franz Xaver Witt for the Cecilian society. The manuscript is archived at the Österreichische Nationalbibliothek. The motet was first published in band IV/2, pp. 496-497 of the Göllerich/Auer biography.

Music 

The 57-bar motet in F major for choir a cappella, is based on the verses "Salvum fac populum tuum" till "Quem ad modum speravimus in te." of the Te Deum. 

This, for Bruckner a quite unique composition, which uses the same verses as part 4 of his Te Deum, alternates passages in unison, in Falsobordone and in polyphony.

Discography 

There are a few recordings of Bruckner's Salvum fac populum tuum:
 Robert Jones, Choir of St. Bride's Church, Bruckner: Motets – CD: Naxos 8.550956, 1994
 Alois Koch, choir of the St. Hedwig's Cathedral, Anton Bruckner: Messe in e-Moll – CD: Ars Musici 1186-2, 1996 (with accompaniment of trombones)
 Balduin Sulzer, Mozart Chor Linz, Bruckner – CD: AtemMusik Records ATMU 97001, 1997
 Hans-Christoph Rademann, NDR Chor Hamburg, Anton Bruckner: Ave Maria – CD: Carus 83.151, 2000
 Philipp von Steinäcker, Vocalensemble Musica Saeculorum, Bruckner: Pange lingua - Motetten - CD: Fra Bernardo FB 1501271, 2015
 Sigvards Klava, Latvian Radio Choir, Bruckner: Latin Motets, 2019 – CD Ondine OD 1362
 Christian Erny, The Zurich Chamber Singers, Bruckner Spectrum - CD : Berlin Classics LC06203, 2022

References

Sources 
 August Göllerich, Anton Bruckner. Ein Lebens- und Schaffens-Bild,  – posthumous edited by Max Auer by G. Bosse, Regensburg, 1932
 Anton Bruckner – Sämtliche Werke, Band XXI: Kleine Kirchenmusikwerke, Musikwissenschaftlicher Verlag der Internationalen Bruckner-Gesellschaft, Hans Bauernfeind and Leopold Nowak (Editor), Vienna, 1984/2001
 Cornelis van Zwol, Anton Bruckner 1824–1896 – Leven en werken, uitg. Thoth, Bussum, Netherlands, 2012. 
 Uwe Harten, Anton Bruckner. Ein Handbuch. , Salzburg, 1996.

External links 
 
 
 Salvum fac populum tuum F-dur, WAB 40  Critical discography by Hans Roelofs 
 Live performances can be heard on YouTube:
by Les Choristes (2008): Salvum fac populum tuum - Les Choristes
by the Landesjugendchor Vorarlberg (2016): Salvum fac populum tuum - Landesjugendchor Vorarlberg 

Motets by Anton Bruckner
1884 compositions
Compositions in F major